The women's pole vault event at the 2021 European Athletics Indoor Championships was held on 6 March at 18:45 local time.

Medalists

Records

Results

References

2021 European Athletics Indoor Championships
Pole vault at the European Athletics Indoor Championships
European